Sheykhvanlu-ye Olya (also Romanized as Sheykhvānlū-ye ‘Olyā; also known as Sheykhvānlū-ye Bālā) is a village in Shahrestaneh Rural District, Now Khandan District, Dargaz County, Razavi Khorasan Province, Iran. At the 2006 census, its population was 21, in 7 families.

References 

Populated places in Dargaz County